Mieszczk  is a village in the administrative district of Gmina Sierpc, within Sierpc County, Masovian Voivodeship, in east-central Poland. From 1975–1998, the town administratively belonged to the province of Plock.

References

Mieszczk